Lepton is a village and former civil parish near Huddersfield, now in the parish of Kirkburton, in the Kirklees district, in the county of West Yorkshire, England. In 1931 the parish had a population of 3323.

Notable aspects of Lepton

Some of the more notable aspects of the village include;

 The football and cricket club, Lepton Highlanders. The cricket team play in the Huddersfield Cricket League. The football team play in the Huddersfield and District Association Football League.
 Rowley Lane Junior, Infant and Nursery School, 
 Lepton Church of England School 
 St John's Church.

History 
The name "Lepton" may mean 'leap farm/settlement'. Lepton was recorded in the Domesday Book as Leptone. Lepton was formerly a township in the parish of Kirkheaton, from 1866 Lepton was a civil parish in its own right until it was abolished on 1 April 1938 and merged with Kirkburton.

See also
Listed buildings in Kirkburton

References 

Villages in West Yorkshire
Geography of Huddersfield
Former civil parishes in West Yorkshire
Kirkburton